Admiral Winthrop may refer to:

 Robert Winthrop Simpson (1799–1877), admiral
 Robert Winthrop (1764 - 1832)
 George Teal Sebor Winthrop